"Tennessee Stud" is a song by Jimmy Driftwood.

Tennessee Stud may also refer to:
 Tennessee Stud (album), a 2003 album by Doc Watson featuring the above song
 Tennessee Stud, a ring name of wrestler Ron Fuller